Tommaso Ghinassi (born 2 June 1987) is an Italian footballer who plays as a defender for San Donato.

Biography
Ghinassi was signed by Prato in a temporary deal in January 2012. He was re-signed by Prato on 25 August 2012.

On 7 July 2014 Ghinassi was signed by Pordenone in a 1+1 year contract. The club was relegated at the end of season.

On 14 July 2015 Ghinassi returned to Prato again on a free transfer.

On 27 July 2016 Ghinassi was signed by Siena.

References

External links
AIC Profile (data by football.it) 

Italian footballers
Genoa C.F.C. players
Serie A players
U.S. Pistoiese 1921 players
U.S. Alessandria Calcio 1912 players
A.C. Prato players
A.C.N. Siena 1904 players
Serie C players
Association football defenders
People from Fiesole
1987 births
Living people
Sportspeople from the Metropolitan City of Florence
Footballers from Tuscany